The Archdeacon of Belfast is a senior ecclesiastical officer within the Church of Ireland Diocese of Connor. The archdeacon is responsible for the disciplinary supervision of the clergy. within the diocese.

List of Archdeacons 

 Ven. Barry Dodds (2009-2013), previously rector of St Michael's, Belfast.
 Rt. Rev. George Davison. (2013-20), later Bishop of Connor.
 Ven. Barry Forde (2020-), previously chaplain at the Church of Ireland and Methodist Chaplaincy Belfast.

References

Archdeacons of Belfast
Lists of Anglican archdeacons in Ireland
Diocese of Connor
Religion in Northern Ireland
Diocese of Connor (Church of Ireland)